Gulafjorden is a fjord in Gulen Municipality in Vestland county, Norway. The historic Gulating assemblies in medieval Norway took place in this area. Today, there are several salmon fish farms in the fjord.

The islands of Byrknesøyna, Mjømna, and Sandøyna lie along the southern side of the fjord. The island of Hiserøyna lies on the northern side of the fjord. The village of Eivindvik, the municipal centre of Gulen lies on the mainland, along the northern coast of the fjord.

The fjord ends by splitting into three branches: the Eidsfjorden flows to the south, the Nordgulfjorden flows to the north, and the Austgulfjorden flows to the east.

See also 
 List of Norwegian fjords

References 

Fjords of Vestland
Gulen